The Artvin okrug was a district (okrug) of the Batum Oblast of the Russian Empire, existing between 1878 and 1918. The district was eponymously named for its administrative centre, Artvin, presently part of the Artvin Province of Turkey. The district bordered with the Olti okrug to the south, the Ardahan okrug to the east, the Batumi okrug to the north, and the Ottoman Empire to the west. Between 1883 and 1903, the Artvin okrug formed a part of the Kutaisi Governorate.

Administrative divisions 
The subcounties (uchastoks) of the Artvin okrug were:

Demographics

Russian Empire Census 
The majority of the population indicated Turkish to be their mother tongue, with significant Armenian and Georgian speaking minorities.

Kavkazskiy kalendar 

Notes

References

Bibliography

See also 

 Kars Oblast
 Treaty of San Stefano
 Treaty of Berlin (1878)

 
Caucasus Viceroyalty (1801–1917)
Modern history of Georgia (country)
History of Adjara
19th century in Georgia (country)
1900s in Georgia (country)
1910s in Georgia (country)
States and territories established in 1878
States and territories disestablished in 1883
States and territories established in 1903
States and territories disestablished in 1917
1870s establishments in Georgia (country)
1917 disestablishments in Georgia (country)
1878 establishments in the Russian Empire
1880s disestablishments in the Russian Empire
1903 establishments in the Russian Empire
1917 disestablishments in Russia